Days Like This is the third album from Dutch band Krezip. It peaked at #3 in the Dutch Mega Album Top 100.

Production
After the tour for Krezip's debut album Nothing Less finished, lead singer Jacqueline Govaert suffered from writer's block, hindering the quick recording of a follow-up. Additionally, the band underwent a change in sound. During the aforementioned tour, Govaert had damaged her vocal cords and required surgery, after which the character of her voice changed. The band also went from a five-piece to a six-piece; guitarist Annelies Kuijsters had injured her hand during the tour and was unable to continue playing the guitar. The band decided she would continue by playing keyboards, and enlisted guitarist Thomas Holthuis to take the vacant guitar position.

Track listing
All songs written by Jacqueline Govaert except where noted.

 "You Can Say" (Govaert/Oscar Holleman) - 03:04 
 "Take It Baby" (Govaert/Holleman) - 03:10 
 "Gentle" - 03:27 
 "Promise" - 03:23 
 "What It Takes" - 02:57 
 "Days Like This" (Govaert/Holleman) - 03:27 
 "Don't You Feel Afraid" - 04:03 
 "For Sure" - 03:31 
 "Mine" (Govaert/Holleman) - 03:18 
 "There It Goes" - 02:50 
 "More Than This" - 03:17 
 "That'll Be Me" - 02:55

References

2002 albums
Krezip albums